The 2016 Open du Pays d'Aix was a professional tennis tournament played on clay courts. It was the third edition of the tournament which was part of the 2016 ATP Challenger Tour. It took place in Aix-en-Provence, France between 2 and 8 May 2016.

Singles main-draw entrants

Seeds

 1 Rankings as of April 25, 2016.

Other entrants
The following players received wildcards into the singles main draw:
  Calvin Hemery
  Maxime Chazal
  Grégoire Barrère
  Julien Benneteau

The following players received entry as a special exempt to gain entry into the main draw:
  Constant Lestienne
  Marek Michalička

The following player received entry as a protected ranking to gain entry into the main draw:
  Albano Olivetti

The following players received entry from the qualifying draw:
  Yann Marti
  Nikola Mektić
  Yannik Reuter
  Martin Vaïsse

The following players entered as a lucky loser:
  David Guez

Champions

Singles

 Thiago Monteiro def.  Carlos Berlocq, 4–6, 6–4, 6–1

Doubles

 Oliver Marach /  Philipp Oswald def.  Guillermo Durán /  Máximo González, 6–1, 4–6, [10–7]

External links
Official Website

Open du Pays d'Aix
Open du Pays d'Aix